"On Me" is a song by American rapper Meek Mill from his fourth studio album Championships (2018). It features guest vocals from American rapper Cardi B. It was written by the two performers along with Nija Charles and its producers Bangladesh and Benny Wond3r. Following the album release, the track entered the US Billboard Hot 100 at number 30 and was certified Gold by the Recording Industry Association of America (RIAA).

Background
Producer Bangladesh first teased the collaboration in October 2018. A snippet of the song surfaced online the same month, previewing short parts from both Cardi and Meek's verses. HotNewHipHop described it as a "heavy, trap-influenced" track.

Critical reception
Erin Lowers opined in Exclaim! that Cardi B "fleshes out the sex-adorned "On Me" flawlessly." Writing for Billboard, Sowmya Krishnamurthy called the song "energetic" and "[a] standout moment" on the album, which "features Cardi B stealing the show in perhaps her most confident rapping to date." In Pitchfork, Evan Rytlewski noticed Cardi B raps "exclusively in flexes on "On Me," and described the song as "a rowdy number cut from a distinctly "Bodak Yellow"-esque cloth." Reviewing the song's parent album Aaron McKrell of HipHopDX cited "On Me" and "Splash Warning" as examples of tracks where Meek "lightens the mood with carefree songs, and at best—like—he and his guests are supremely entertaining." Christopher R. Weingarten of Rolling Stone also cited it as one of the album's "straight bangers".

Charts

Certifications

References

External links

2018 songs
Meek Mill songs
Cardi B songs
Songs written by Meek Mill
Songs written by Cardi B
Songs written by Nija Charles
Song recordings produced by Bangladesh (record producer)
Songs written by Bangladesh (record producer)